Return to the Wide Open Spaces is a live album saxophonist David "Fathead" Newman, pianist Ellis Marsalis and guitarist Cornell Dupree, recorded at the Caravan of Dreams in 1990 and released on the Amazing label.

Reception

In his review for AllMusic, Scott Yanow states "For this live concert recorded at the Caravan of Dreams in Fort Worth, a mostly all-star group of Texas jazzmen (plus pianist Ellis Marsalis from New Orleans) was gathered together. The music, which includes four blues and three standards among its nine selections, lacks any real surprises. ... Some better planning and the utilization of a few charts (rather than the funcitonal frameworks) would have elevated the pleasing date to a much higher level". The Los Angeles Times said "there's a lot of good, unpretentious playing here... More originality and less predictability would have improved this date".

Track listing 
 Introduction – 1:26
 "Buster's Tune" (Buster Smith) – 5:23
 "Hard Times" (Paul Mitchell) – 8:22
 "13th Floor" (David "Fathead" Newman) – 7:22
 "Things Ain't What They Used to Be" (Mercer Ellington, Ted Persons) – 5:18
 "These Foolish Things" (Jack Stracheyl, Holt Marvell, Harry Link) – 5:05	
 "Two Bones and a Pick" (Aaron Walker) – 6:19
 "City Lights" (Jimmy McGriff) – 10:03
 "Lush Life" (Billy Strayhorn) – 7:10
 "A Night in Tunisia" (Dizzy Gillespie, Frank Paparelli) – 9:58

Personnel 
David "Fathead" Newman – alto saxophone, flute
Ellis Marsalis – piano
Cornell Dupree – guitar
James Clay – tenor saxophone 
Dennis Dotson – trumpet
Leroy Cooper – baritone saxophone
Chuck Rainey - bass
George Rains – drums

References 

David "Fathead" Newman live albums
Ellis Marsalis Jr. live albums
Cornell Dupree live albums
1990 live albums